Machaire Rabhartaigh (known in English as Magheroarty), meaning "plain of the spring tide/plain of Roarty", is a Gaeltacht village and townland on the north-west coast of County Donegal in Ulster, the northern province in Ireland. It is in the parish of Cloughaneely and its main access road is the R257.

It has been home to a Gael Linn Irish language Summer school since 1981 which runs courses for teenagers aged 12–18 every summer, and has an intake of about 200 students per course.

The village has a port used by fishing vessels. It also the main ferry port for Tory Island.

It attracts tourists during the summer and watersports enthusiasts visit the area to windsurf/surf/kitesurf and to go kayaking in the bay. A natural reef exists to the left of the pier which provides excellent surf throughout the year. Amenities include Coll's Bar & Pub grub, a café (Salt & Sand) and Scoil Naomh Dubhthach Machaire Rabhartaigh, an Irish-speaking primary school.

References

Cloughaneely
Gaeltacht places in County Donegal
Gaeltacht towns and villages
Geography of County Donegal